Thiru Vi. Ka. Bridge is a road bridge across the Adyar River in Chennai, India. It is connects Mylapore to the north of the river with Adyar to the south. Named after Indian independence activist Thiru. V. Kalyanasundaram, the bridge was constructed in 1973 to replace the old-fashioned Elphinstone Bridge which is currently not in use.

References

Bridges and flyovers in Chennai